The Permanent Representative of Bangladesh to the United Nations is the head of Permanent Mission of Bangladesh to the United Nations. The Permanent Representative of Bangladesh to the United Nations is the foremost representative of Bangladesh to the United Nations and holds of the rank of Ambassador.

Permanent representatives to the United Nations
 1974-1976: S. A. Karim
1976-1982: Khwaja. M. Kaiser
1982-1986: Khwaja Wasiuddin
1986-1988: B. A. Siddiqi
1988-1990: A. H. S. Ataul Karim
1990-1991: A. H. G. Mohiuddin
1991-1991: Mohammed Mohsin
1991-1994: M. Humayun Kabir
1994-1996: Reaz Rahman
1996-2001: Anwarul Karim Chowdhury
 2001-2007: Iftekhar Ahmed Chowdhury
 2007-2009: Ismat Jahan
 2009-2015: Abulkalam Abdul Momen
 2015–2019: Masud Bin Momen
 2019-2022: Rabab Fatima
 2022–Present: Muhammad Abdul Muhith

References

 
Bangladesh and the United Nations
United Nations